Magnolia was a wooden-hulled steamship that operated on Puget Sound from 1907 to 1937.

Career
Magnolia was built at Tacoma in 1907 for the Tacoma and Burton Navigation Company, which intended her to replace Burton on the company's routes around Tacoma and Vashon Island.  The company's chief rival was the Vashon Navigation Company, which ran the steamer Vashon, under Captain Chauncey "Chance" Wyman.  Once launched, Magnolia, under Capt. Fred Sutter, raced Vashon daily between landings to be the first boat to pick up the business.  By 1909, the rate wars had died down, and Magnolia and Vashon were running on different schedules.

Magnolia had been transferred to the route between Seattle and Olympia.  For a time in 1911, the steamer Nisqually was run on the same route, but when Nisqually was taken off the route and sent to the Columbia River, Magnolia became the last steamboat to make the Seattle-Olympia run.  As passenger fares fell off, Magnolia was converted to a towboat.

Notes

References
 Findlay, Jean Cammon and Paterson, Robin, Mosquito Fleet of Southern Puget Sound, (2008) Arcadia Publishing 
 Newell, Gordon, Ships of the Inland Sea, Binford and Mort, Portland, OR (2nd Ed. 1960)
 Newell, Gordon, and Williamson, Joe, Pacific Steamboats, Bonanza Books, New York, NY (1963)

Propeller-driven steamboats of Washington (state)
1907 ships
Ships built in Tacoma, Washington
Steamboats of Washington (state)